The Christ the King Seminary is a Roman Catholic seminary in Gulshan-e-Iqbal Town, Karachi, Pakistan; located in  adjacent to the Portiuncula Friary. In its early years most of the faculty were provided by the Franciscans. It has been described as "the pioneering theological institution for the Catholic Church in Pakistan."

The high-water mark of the seminary's 50-year existence was the recruitment of 98 seminarians for the class that entered in 1990.

Origins
On 5 April 1957 Pope Pius XII issued a decree through the Congregation of the Faith to build a regional seminary in Karachi.

When the seminary started in 1956 it had only four students. Among them was Archbishop Lawrence Saldanha of Lahore, who later went on to become its Rector.  Other alumni include the Archbishop Emeritus of Karachi Evarist Pinto, the late Bishop Anthony Theodore Lobo of Islamabad-Rawalpindi, Joseph Cardinal Coutts, the late Bishop Andrew Francis of Multan, and the late Bishop John Joseph of Faisalabad and the late Bishop Patras Yusaf of Multan.

Fifty years on, the seminary has graduated 780 students from Pakistan and abroad, some coming from Bangladesh, India, Indonesia, Italy, the Netherlands and Sri Lanka. It also expanded over the decades, adding a grassy field for soccer and cricket, a basketball court, a pavilion, a retreat center and a Marian grotto with a fountain.

The National Catholic Institute of Theology (NCIT) was established at the seminary in September 1997, offering academic courses leading to a diploma in theology, as well as programs for laypeople and Religious involved in Church ministries. At the Institute students can now obtain a Bachelor of Theology degree from the University of Melbourne due to the efforts of Yarra Theological Union and the Melbourne College of Divinity.

Developments
In 1994 the philosophy studies program for seminarians was separated from the theology program and moved to the St. Francis Xavier Seminary in the Lahore archdiocese.

In addition to dwindling vocations, the seminary has had to deal with a shortage of drinking water over the last 10 years, exacerbated by local authorities appropriation, without compensation, of its old well in November 2005 for the Lyari Expressway project.

The expressway project is part of Karachi's "Cleaning the City" drive, which the Asian Human Rights Commission says has rendered thousands homeless. It adds that 11,000 houses and 3,100 commercial buildings outside the path of the expressway have been evacuated and demolished.

Since 2008 the seminary has been hosting the Cardinal Cordeiro Cricket tournament to promote religious vocations and remember Pakistan's first cardinal. In 2010 there are 43 students from all six dioceses and the Apostolic Prefecture of Quetta.

In 2010, a grant from Aid to the Church in Need was made to the Seminary where it will be used for library books and new air conditioning units.

In 2011 there were 24 seminarians in the institution.  By 2014 this had risen to 40.

On 4 May 2012 Cardinal Fernando Filoni, Prefect of the Congregation for the Evangelization of Peoples, appointed Fr. Benjamin Shahzad as Rector of the Seminary.

In June 2019 the number of seminarians had risen to 72.

Rectors
The following individuals have served as rectors of the seminary:

Notable alumni

 Rufin Anthony
 Joseph Arshad
 Joseph Coutts
 Patrick D'Rozario
 Andrew Francis
 Arnold Heredia
 George Ibrahim
 John Joseph
 Anthony Theodore Lobo
 Joseph Paul
 Evarist Pinto
 Joseph Indrias Rehmat
 Lawrence Saldanha
 Sebastian Francis Shah
 Augustine Soares
 Benny Travas
 Patras Yusaf

References

External links
 Catholic Hierarchy
 Newsline, August 2002
 Pontificia Universitàs Urbaniana

Catholic seminaries in Pakistan
Educational institutions established in 1956
1956 establishments in Pakistan
Education in Karachi